Kuik-e Azizi Amin (also Romanized as Kū’īk-e ‘Azīzī Amīn; also known as Kū’īk-e ‘Azīz and Kūyakī-ye ‘Azīz) is a village in Dasht-e Zahab Rural District, in the Central District of Sarpol-e Zahab County, Kermanshah Province, Iran. At the 2006 census, its population was 639, in 121 families.

References 

Populated places in Sarpol-e Zahab County